Minab (also Romanized as Mīnāb) is a city and capital of Minab County, Hormozgan Province, Iran.

External links

  Minab Castle
 Castle of Minab
 Qeshm Canyon, Minab
 Country near Minab
 Video in the Minabi language

References 

Populated places in Minab County
Cities in Hormozgan Province